Henri Van Averbeke (born 26 October 1901, date of death unknown) was a Belgian footballer. He played in fourteen matches for the Belgium national football team between 1926 and 1929.

References

External links
 
 

1901 births
Year of death missing
Belgian footballers
Belgium international footballers
Place of birth missing
Association football defenders
K. Beerschot V.A.C. players